GPI mannosyltransferase 2 is an enzyme that in humans is encoded by the PIGV gene.

See also
Hyperphosphatasia with mental retardation syndrome (HPMRS)

References

Further reading